Christopher Donald Frith,  (born 16 March 1942) is a British psychologist and professor emeritus at the Wellcome Trust Centre for Neuroimaging at University College London. Visiting Professor at the Interacting Minds Centre at Aarhus University, Research Fellow at the Institute of Philosophy and Quondam Fellow of All Souls College, Oxford.

Education
Chris Frith was born in 1942 in Cross in Hand, Sussex and educated at The Leys School in Cambridge, before reading Natural Sciences at the University of Cambridge as an undergraduate student of Christ's College, Cambridge. After graduation, he completed a Diploma in Abnormal Psychology and PhD at the Institute of Psychiatry in 1969 under the supervision of Hans Eysenck.

Research
His primary research interest is in the applications of functional brain imaging to the study of social cognition, although he is also well known for his earlier seminal work characterising the cognitive basis of schizophrenia.

He has published over 500 papers in peer reviewed journals and has an h-index of 225 as of GoogleScholar. He is the author of a number of important neuroscience books, including the classic The Cognitive Neuropsychology of Schizophrenia (1992/2015) and the popular science book Making up the Mind (2007), which was on the long list for the Royal Society Prizes for Science Books in 2008. His former doctoral students include David A. Nathaniel-James, Muwafak H Al-Eithan, Geraint Rees and Sarah-Jayne Blakemore.

Awards and honours
Frith was elected a Fellow of the Royal Society (FRS) in 2000, a Fellow of the British Academy (FBA) in 2008 and a Fellow of the American Association for the Advancement of Science in 2000.

In September 2008, a festschrift was organised in his honour by The Wellcome Trust Centre for Neuroimaging and the Institute of Cognitive Neuroscience. In 2009 he was awarded the Fyssen Foundation Prize for his work on neuropsychology and he and Uta Frith were awarded the European Latsis Prize for their work linking the human mind and the human brain. In 2014, he and Uta Frith were awarded the Jean Nicod Prize for their work on social cognition.

Personal life
Chris Frith is the brother of guitarist Fred Frith and musicologist Simon Frith. In 1966 he married Uta Frith, a developmental psychologist. In 2008 they were the subject of a double portrait by Emma Wesley. They have two children.

References

External links

1942 births
Living people
British cognitive neuroscientists
Neuropsychologists
Fellows of All Souls College, Oxford
Fellows of the American Association for the Advancement of Science
Fellows of the Royal Society
Academics of University College London
Wellcome Trust
Fellows of the British Academy
People associated with The Institute for Cultural Research